Justin Fazio (born May 3, 1997) is a Canadian-born Italian ice hockey player for Asiago Hockey 1935 in the ICE Hockey League (ICEHL) and the Italian national team.

He represented Italy at the 2021 IIHF World Championship.

References

External links

1997 births
Living people
Asiago Hockey 1935 players
Bolzano HC players
Charlotte Checkers (2010–) players
Expatriate ice hockey players in the United States
Ice hockey people from Ontario
Italian ice hockey goaltenders
Milwaukee Admirals players
Reading Royals players
Sarnia Sting players
Sportspeople from Sarnia